Steven Ray Wiig (born December 30, 1972) is an American film actor, director, producer and musician. He appeared in the films Into the Wild, Metallica: Some Kind of Monster, Milk, and The Master. He is also the drummer in the band Papa Wheelie.  Wiig is the primary songwriter in his band The Martichora (all instruments) along with Rich Doucette.

Life and career
Wiig was born December 30, 1972, in Ishpeming, Michigan. He grew up in Negaunee and graduated from Negaunee High School in 1991, where he was voted "Most Artistic" by his classmates. Wiig attended Northern Michigan University. He relocated to Minnesota after college in the mid-nineties, where he performed with his band, The Martichora, and produced & acted in several student films, including All Praise The Electric Light. Soon after, he began working on the road and in the recording studio with multi-Grammy award-winning heavy metal band Metallica.

In 2000, Wiig relocated to Sausalito, California to work with Metallica bassist Jason Newsted at his home studio and play in Newsted's band, Papa Wheelie. He continued working and traveling the world with Metallica for over a decade performing numerous duties—fan club writer, photographer, videographer, backline assistant, production, and band personal assistant. Wiig played bass for Metallica at The Playboy Mansion in 1998 (filling in for Newsted). Wiig has appeared in several films and assisted Oscar-winner Penn on several personal and professional projects and worked as a consultant for Social Capital Films for Ridley Scott's Tell-Tale. In 2009, Wiig teamed up with fellow Upper Michigan-native Ron Riekki to produce Riekki's novel, U.P. (2008), later made into a movie.

In 2010, Wiig documented Faith No More's homecoming reunion 'trilogy' performances at San Francisco's Warfield Theater and directed Jerry Hannan's "The Bridge", a music video for the film Guitar Man. In September 2010, Wiig & Riekki embarked on a tour of Michigan's Upper Peninsula, promoting Riekki's novel, U.P.. During a homecoming event at The Vista Theatre, Mayor Paul Gravedoni presented Wiig with a resolution recognizing him for his vision of bringing the City of Negaunee recognition through film and his dedication to the arts.

2011 saw Wiig return to acting in HBO's Hemingway & Gellhorn.  Under Philip Kaufman's direction, Wiig portrayed Simo Häyhä during the Winter War, leading a group of Finnish soldiers to shelter where Martha Gellhorn (played by Nicole Kidman) is reporting on World War II.

In July 2011, Wiig acted in three major films (including Paul Thomas Anderson's movie The Master). In 2014, he starred in Dead Metaphors, a short film in which he portrays a self-destructive, reclusive novelist who hasn't published in decades who is discovered and pushed to the brink of a complete mental breakdown. The film features songs by Tom Waits and was featured at the 2014 ArcovertLA Film festival.

Wiig continues acting, producing & directing and is actively working to bring more film projects to Upper Michigan.

Filmography
As Actor:
All Praise The Electric Light (student film)
Metallica: Some Kind of Monster (2004)
Into the Wild (2007)
Milk (2008)
Hemingway & Gellhorn (2012)  deleted scene
The Master (2012)
Yosemite (2015)
America Is Still The Place (2015)
Dead Metaphors (2015)
Around Midnight (2015)
Ant-Man (2015)

Discography
GROINBLITZER
1989-1991
The Lesser
The Martichora
all releases
Papa Wheelie

References

External links
TWO EYES Productions Website
Second Wave Feature
"Moving on UP" SF Chronicle, September 5, 2010
SF Chronicle PHOTO
Local-born actor eyes the idea of bringing U.P. to the big screen
U.P., the movie
U.P. native goes Into the Wild
Musician-actor keeps his connection to U.P. strong
McCandless story has U.P. connection
Metallica embraces U.P. native

1972 births
Male actors from Michigan
American male film actors
American heavy metal musicians
Living people
Musicians from Michigan
Northern Michigan University alumni
People from Negaunee, Michigan
21st-century American male actors